Dianjiang railway station is a railway station in Dianjiang County, Chongqing, China. It is an intermediate stop on the Chongqing–Wanzhou intercity railway. It opened with the line on 28 November 2016.

References 

Railway stations in Chongqing
Railway stations in China opened in 2016